Badminton events for the 1977 Southeast Asian Games were held at Kuala Lumpur, Malaysia between 19 to 26 November 1977. Individual as well as Team competitions were conducted. Surapong Suharitdamrong (Thailand, Men's singles), Thongkam Kingmanee & Porntip Buntanon (Thailand, Women's doubles), Ong Ah Hong (Malaysia, Women's singles) and Dominic Soong & Koay Kar Lin (Malaysia, Men's doubles); all of these players finished fourth. At the end of the competitions, debutant Indonesia dominated by winning six out of seven possible gold medals. Malaysia won a single gold in Women's singles discipline.

Medalists

Final results

Medal table

References

External links 

1977
1977 in badminton
1977 in Malaysian sport
Sports competitions in Kuala Lumpur
1977 Southeast Asian Games events